Cicindela marginipennis is a species of tiger beetle native to the eastern North America. Its range is primarily the eastern United States but it also occurs in Canada where it is listed as vulnerable.

References

marginipennis
Beetles of North America
Beetles described in 1831
Taxonomy articles created by Polbot